Leigh Ashley Jakes (born March 24, 1988) is an American soccer player who currently plays for NiceFutis in the Finnish women's premier division Naisten Liiga.

Career 
Jakes has previously played for Northwestern Wildcats in the Big Ten Conference, Chicago Red Stars in the Women's Premier Soccer League, Falköpings KIK in the Swedish second tier Elitettan and Kokkola F10 in the Finnish women's league.

Family 
Leigh Jakes is the daughter of Rhonda and Van Jakes who was a cornerback in the National Football League for six seasons.

References 

1988 births
People from McDonough, Georgia
Expatriate women's footballers in Sweden
Expatriate women's footballers in Finland
American women's soccer players
Living people
Kansallinen Liiga players
Kokkola Futis 10 players
NiceFutis players
Women's association football defenders
Chicago Red Stars players
Northwestern Wildcats women's soccer players
National Women's Soccer League players
Soccer players from Georgia (U.S. state)
Women's Premier Soccer League players
Sportspeople from the Atlanta metropolitan area
American expatriate women's soccer players
American expatriate sportspeople in Sweden
American expatriate sportspeople in Finland